Aristida tuberculosa, common names seaside threeawn, seabeach needlegrass, beach three-awned grass and beach needlegrass, is annual plant  native to the United States.

Conservation status within the United States
It is  listed as endangered in Connecticut  and New Hampshire, as rare in Indiana, and as threatened in Massachusetts and Michigan.

References

tuberculosa
Flora of the United States